Bugged by a Bee is a 1969 Warner Bros. Looney Tunes animated cartoon directed by Robert McKimson. It starred Cool Cat, and was the final cartoon from the 1930–1969 era to bear the Looney Tunes name, and the last from that era to be widely released. One more cartoon, Injun Trouble, would follow Bugged by a Bee, but it was in the Merrie Melodies series.

This cartoon was the last Looney Tunes short until 1987's The Duxorcist.

Synopsis
Cool Cat, a student at Disco Tech, sings about how he's "workin' through college to gain a lotta knowledge." A bee disturbs him which he swats to the ground with his guitar. As the angry bee sharpens its stinger, Cool Cat checks out the college's sports programs and decides to try out pole vaulting to impress the female students. His first attempt goes wrong when his pole gets stuck in a chipmunk's hole, and when he goes again the bee stings him as he begins his run-up. The pain gives Cool Cat enough power in his run-up to set a record-breaking vault over the pole and the college's baseball coach is impressed enough to let him try out for the team.

In his first baseball match Cool Cat tries to swat the bee instead of hitting the ball and records two strikes. On the crucial third ball Cool Cat hits a home run, which he completes with help from the bee's sting. The bee also helps him to triumphs in rowing and hurdling. In an important football match which is 0–0 in the final few minutes, Cool Cat is stung causing him to swallow the ball and dart around the stadium, while the other players ask each other who has got the ball. Cool Cat  flops down on the touchline and is stung again, causing him to spit the ball out and score the winning touchdown.

The college holds a ceremony to honor Cool Cat's achievements which have propelled Disco Tech to the top of the sports leagues. To Cool Cat's chagrin, however, the bee is celebrated at the ceremony rather than himself.

See also
 List of American films of 1969

References

External links
 

1969 films
1969 animated films
1969 short films
1960s Warner Bros. animated short films
Looney Tunes shorts
Films directed by Robert McKimson
1960s American animated films
Films about bees
Films about tigers
Films scored by William Lava
American animated short films
1960s English-language films